HD 32518 (HR 1636) is a solitary star in the northern circumpolar constellation Camelopardalis. It has an apparent magnitude of 6.42, placing it near the max naked eye visibility.

HD 32518 has a stellar classification of K1 III, indicating that it is an orange giant star. Located in the cool end in the red clump, the object is currently on the horizontal branch. It shines at 46.4 times the luminosity of the Sun from its enlarged photosphere at an effective temperature of 4,731 K, giving it an yellowish orange glow. HD 32518 is older than the Sun with an age of 6.4 billion years and spins slowly with a projected rotational velocity of 1.2 km/s−1. However, this amount is poorly constrained. As for its metallicity, studies place it around solar level.

Planetary System
In August 2009, a group of astrometers discovered a gas giant orbiting the giant star using doppler spectroscopy.

For the 100th anniversary of the IAU HD 32518 and the planet HD 32518b were selected NameExoWorlds campaigns for Germany. The approved name of the star HD 32518 is Mago, named after Mago National Park in Ethiopia, which is noted for its giraffes. The name was suggested by pupils of a physics course at the Max-Born-Gymnasium in Neckargemünd.

See also 
 11 Ursae Minoris
 List of extrasolar planets

References 

K-type giants
032518
024003
1636
Camelopardalis (constellation)
Planetary systems with one confirmed planet
Durchmusterung objects